Patuxent Music is an independent record label in Rockville, Maryland.

History 
Bluegrass musician Tom Mindte started recording music by other artists in 1984 with a reel to reel recorder in his father's air conditioning shop. In 1990 Tom opened his own studio, and started the Patuxent label in 1996.

Notable projects
Patuxent Music's first project was recording fiddler Joe Meadows in 1995. When the original record label couldn't release the recording,  Patuxent released it as their first album in 1996.

The Patuxent Banjo Project compiled music from 40 past and current banjo players from the Baltimore-Washington corridor. It was produced by musicians Mark Delaney and Randy Barrett. The backing band included David McLaughlin (mandolin), Danny Knicely (guitar), Tad Marks (fiddle), and Mark Schatz (bass). Among the banjo players recorded were Bill Emerson, Eddie Adcock, Tom Adams, and Roni Stoneman.

Artists
Here is a partial list of artists who have released recordings on the Patuxent label:

 Steve Abshire
 Red Allen and Frank Wakefield
 Jessie Baker
 Banana Express
 Mike Baytop
 Rob Benzing
 Audie Blaylock and Redline
 Bluestone
 Scott Brannon
 Buffalo Nickel Band
 Cane Mill Road
 Russ Carson
 Charm City Junction
 John Colianni
 Larry Coryell
 Bryan Deere
 Mark Delaney
 Casey Driscoll
 Eleanor Ellis
 Brennen Ernst

 Tom Ewing
 Harpe Franklin & Usilton
 Rick Franklin
 Victor Furtado
 Daniel Greeson
 Nate Grower
 Tatiana Hargreaves
 Billy Hurt, Jr.
 Al Jones
 Nate Leath
 Leslie & Jacque
 James Leva
 Corrina Rose Logston
 The Maloy Brothers
 Rusty Mason
 The Mayfield Brothers
 Patrick McAvinue
 Patuxent Partners
 Miss Tess
 Monroe Fields

 Akira Otsuka
 Danny Paisley
 Joshua Palmer
 Kevin Prater
 Bill Runkle
 Barbara Scott
 Donnie "Dobro" Scott
 Louie Setzer
 Karl Shiflett and Big Country Show
 Reece Shipley
 C. T. Smith
 Springfield Exit
 Jeremy Stephens
 Jordan Tice
 Andrew Vogts
 Weems Creek Ramblers
 The Wildmans
 Warner Williams
 Zekiah Swamp Cats

See also 
 List of record labels

References

External links
 

American record labels
American independent record labels